"You Can Trust in My Love" is a song recorded by Canadian country music artist Charlie Major. It was released in 1998 as the fourth single from his third studio album, Everything's Alright. It peaked at number 10 on the RPM Country Tracks chart in October 1998.

Chart performance

References

1997 songs
1998 singles
Charlie Major songs
Songs written by Charlie Major
ViK. Recordings singles